Sandile 'Nkomishi' Ginindza is a Liswati professional footballer who plays for Mbabane Swallows F.C. and the Eswatini national football team.

Career

Sandile Ginindza played in the 4-2 2016 COSAFA Cup win over Zambia, making two penalty shoot-out saves before scoring the winning penalty, therefore scoring his first career penalty thus enabling his team to reach the semi-finals. Also, he was named in both Swaziland squads for the 2017 Africa Cup of Nations qualifiers and for the 2016 COSAFA Cup.

Orlando Pirates FC were reportedly watching him play in a 3-0 win over Manzini Sea Birds F.C. to replace their late goalkeeper Senzo Meyiwa.

Assailing a Mbabane Swallows F.C. fan and a Deputy Sheriff who tried to intervene, he was brought before a magistrate and was liable to be fined E15000 which is the consequence for assaulting a spectator according to the Swazi Premier League rules in Article 7.

Featured as 'Moemish of the Week' in the show Soccer Zone on Monday when he made an error which made it 2-0 for Thanda Royal Zulu F.C.

References

External links
 

Living people
1988 births
Swazi footballers
Eswatini international footballers
Association football goalkeepers
Mbabane Swallows players
National First Division players